Senecaville Lake is a reservoir in Guernsey and Noble Counties, Ohio. The lake is popular among recreation and fishing enthusiasts. It is often referred to locally as Seneca Lake.

History
Senecaville Dam was built in 1937 by the U.S. Army Corps of Engineers as part of the Muskingum Watershed Conservancy District's flood control and water conservation project.  The Seneca Fork of Wills Creek valley was dammed to create a flood control and water conservation reservoir.  The reservoir presently forms a conservation pool for flood control, recreation, fish and wildlife, and for the maintenance of normal downstream flows during dry periods.

Senecaville Dam

The Senecaville Dam is located at the northwest end of the lake near the village of Senecaville. Originally completed in 1937, the structure was modified in 1982. The core is homogeneous earth with a foundation of rock and soil. The dam is separated into two embankment sections, north and south, by a rock knoll, through which the outlet works run, across a section constructed as a low dike. Maximum discharge is 11400 cubic feet per second.

Recreation
The lake is in the Muskingum Watershed Conservancy District's chain of lakes and all boating, swimming, camping, and picnicking is under MWCD control.  The MWCD coordinates many recreation activities at the lake and operates an activity center within Seneca Lake Park.  The activity center provides day to day information on campground activities and current events.  The MWCD has designated two swimming areas (one is within the park & one is by boat access).  Picnic sites are available at the Seneca Lake Park.

A public boat launch ramp is available near the dam year round. There is one marina located on the lake, Seneca Marina, which is operated by private enterprise. The marina is a full-service facility with boat sales and rentals, fuel, supplies and docking. There is a restaurant at the marina which is open all year.

Limited hiking is available around Senecaville Dam. A more extensive hiking trail system is available within Seneca Lake Park.  Camping at Seneca Lake is available through the MWCD.

Fireworks on the Lake take place on the closest Saturday night to the Fourth of July. The Fireworks are set off from the Big Island.

Fishing
The Ohio Division of Wildlife annually leases public fishing and hunting rights on MWCD lakes and lands.  Fishing is popular all around the lake wherever there is access to the water.  At the dam site, fishing is available above and below the dam.  Seneca Lake contains populations of largemouth bass, crappies, bluegills, bullheads, channel catfish, and walleye. The lake has also been stocked with muskellunge and white bass with moderate success. These species of fish are stocked by the Division of Wildlife.

Fish hatchery
There is also an Ohio Department of Natural Resources fish hatchery located below Senecaville Dam. This facility was acquired from the U.S. Fish and Wildlife Service in 1987. The facility also has two outdoor raceways and 18 indoor rearing troughs. Water is supplied by Seneca Lake, which can deliver . This water supply allows the hatchery to raise saugeye, walleye, hybrid striped bass, and channel catfish. The hatchery is open to visitors and will accommodate tour groups with advanced reservations.

References

External links
Muskingum Watershed Conservancy District
Seneca Lake Marina
Guernsey County Ohio

Geography of Guernsey County, Ohio
Muskingum Watershed Conservancy District
Geography of Noble County, Ohio
Senecaville
United States Army Corps of Engineers dams
Tourist attractions in Guernsey County, Ohio
Tourist attractions in Noble County, Ohio
Dams in Ohio
Dams completed in 1937
1937 establishments in Ohio